These 238 species belong to the genus Pachybrachis, scriptured leaf beetles.

Pachybrachis species

 Pachybrachis abdominalis (Bloch & Schneider, 1801)
 Pachybrachis adspersa Suffrian, 1866
 Pachybrachis alacris Fall, 1915
 Pachybrachis alpinus Rapilly, 1982
 Pachybrachis alticola Fall, 1915
 Pachybrachis analis (Bloch, 1787)
 Pachybrachis anoguttatus Suffrian, 1866
 Pachybrachis antigae Weise, 1900
 Pachybrachis aquilonis 
 Pachybrachis aragonicus Tempere & Rapilly, 1981
 Pachybrachis archboldi Barney, 2016
 Pachybrachis arizonensis Bowditch, 1909
 Pachybrachis assiettae Burlini, 1968
 Pachybrachis atomarius (F. E. Melsheimer, 1847)
 Pachybrachis azureus Suffrian, 1848
 Pachybrachis badius Fall, 1915
 Pachybrachis baeticus Weise, 1882
 Pachybrachis bajulus Suffrian, 1852
 Pachybrachis balsas Bowditch, 1909
 Pachybrachis bifasciatus Jacoby, 1880
 Pachybrachis bivittatus LINNAEUS, 1758
 Pachybrachis bloxham (A. Bloxam, 1827)
 Pachybrachis brevicollis J. L. LeConte, 1880
 Pachybrachis brevicornis Fall, 1915
 Pachybrachis brunneus (Günther, 1870)
 Pachybrachis bullatus Fall, 1915  (bubble-banded pachy)
 Pachybrachis burlinii Daccordi & Ruffo, 1971
 Pachybrachis caelatus (Valenciennes, 1840)
 Pachybrachis calcaratus Fall, 1915
 Pachybrachis calidus Fall, 1915
 Pachybrachis californicus Fall, 1915
 Pachybrachis canigouensis Lambelet, 2005
 Pachybrachis carolinensis Bowditch, 1910
 Pachybrachis carpathicus Rey, 1883
 Pachybrachis catalonicus Burlini, 1968
 Pachybrachis cephalicus Fall, 1915
 Pachybrachis chaoticus Fall, 1915
 Pachybrachis chester 
 Pachybrachis cinctus Suffrian, 1848
 Pachybrachis circumcinctus (Schreber, 1775)
 Pachybrachis coloradensis Bowditch, 1909
 Pachybrachis confederatus Fall, 1915
 Pachybrachis conformis Suffrian, 1852
 Pachybrachis confusus Bowditch, 1909
 Pachybrachis congener Suffrian, 1866
 Pachybrachis connexus Fall, 1915
 Pachybrachis consimilis Fall, 1915
 Pachybrachis conspirator Fall, 1915
 Pachybrachis contractifrons Fall, 1915
 Pachybrachis convictus GÜNTHER, 1864
 Pachybrachis crassus Bowditch, 1909
 Pachybrachis creticus Weise, 1886
 Pachybrachis cribricollis Pic, 1907
 Pachybrachis croftus Bowditch, 1909
 Pachybrachis cruentus J. L. LeConte, 1880
 Pachybrachis cylindricus Bowditch, 1909
 Pachybrachis danieli Burlini, 1968
 Pachybrachis deceptor Riley & Barney, 2015
 Pachybrachis delumbis Fall, 1915
 Pachybrachis densus Bowditch, 1909
 Pachybrachis desertus Fall, 1915
 Pachybrachis deyrupi Barney, 2016
 Pachybrachis dilatatus Suffrian, 1852
 Pachybrachis discoideus Bowditch, 1909
 Pachybrachis diversus Allen & Randall, 1993
 Pachybrachis donneri Gosse, 1851
 Pachybrachis dubiosus (Cuvier, 1830)
 Pachybrachis durangoensis Jacoby, 1889
 Pachybrachis duryi Fall, 1915
 Pachybrachis eburifer Suffrian, 1866
 Pachybrachis elegans Graells, 1851
 Pachybrachis excisus Weise, 1897
 Pachybrachis exclusus Rey, 1883
 Pachybrachis femoratus (Olivier, 1808)
 Pachybrachis fimbriolatus Suffrian, 1848
 Pachybrachis flavescens Jacoby, 1889
 Pachybrachis flexuosus Weise, 1882
 Pachybrachis forreri Jacoby, 1889
 Pachybrachis fortis Fall, 1915
 Pachybrachis fractus Fall, 1915
 Pachybrachis fraudolentus G.Muller, 1955
 Pachybrachis freyi Burlini, 1957
 Pachybrachis fulvipes Suffrian, 1848
 Pachybrachis fuscipes Fall, 1915
 Pachybrachis gracilipes Fall, 1915
 Pachybrachis haematodes Suffrian, 1852  (bloody pachy)
 Pachybrachis hector Fall, 1915
 Pachybrachis hepaticus (F. E. Melsheimer, 1847)
 Pachybrachis hieroglyphicus Laicharting, 1781
 Pachybrachis hippophaes Suffrian, 1848
 Pachybrachis holerorum Montagna & Sassi
 Pachybrachis hybridus Suffrian, 1852
 Pachybrachis illectus Fall, 1915
 Pachybrachis immaculatus (Bloch & Schneider, 1801)
 Pachybrachis impurus Suffrian, 1852
 Pachybrachis inclusa Jacoby, 1889
 Pachybrachis insidiosus Fall, 1915
 Pachybrachis integratus Fall, 1915
 Pachybrachis jacobyi Soto-Adames & Taylor
 Pachybrachis juquilensis Jacoby, 1889
 Pachybrachis karamani Weise, 1893
 Pachybrachis kentuckyensis Riley & Barney, 2015
 Pachybrachis korbi Weise, 1891
 Pachybrachis kraatzi Weise, 1882
 Pachybrachis lachrymosus Fall, 1915
 Pachybrachis laetificus Marseul, 1875
 Pachybrachis laevis Bowditch, 1909
 Pachybrachis laticollis Suffrian, 1860
 Pachybrachis latithorax Clavareau, 1913
 Pachybrachis leonardii Sassi & Scholler, 2003
 Pachybrachis liebecki Fall, 1915
 Pachybrachis limbatus (Menetries, 1836)
 Pachybrachis lindbergi Burlini, 1963
 Pachybrachis lineolatus Suffrian, 1848
 Pachybrachis litigiosus Suffrian, 1852
 Pachybrachis livens J. L. LeConte, 1858
 Pachybrachis lodingi Bowditch, 1909
 Pachybrachis longus Bowditch, 1909
 Pachybrachis luctuosus Suffrian, 1858
 Pachybrachis luridus (Fabricius, 1798)
 Pachybrachis lustrans J. L. LeConte, 1880
 Pachybrachis macronychus (Germar, 1824)
 Pachybrachis maculicollis Jacoby, 1889
 Pachybrachis marginatus Bowditch, 1909
 Pachybrachis marginipennis Bowditch, 1909
 Pachybrachis marmoratus Jacoby, 1889
 Pachybrachis melanostictus Suffrian, 1852
 Pachybrachis mellitus Trewavas, 1935
 Pachybrachis mercurialis Fall, 1915
 Pachybrachis microps Fall, 1915
 Pachybrachis minor Bowditch, 1909
 Pachybrachis minutus Jacoby, 1889
 Pachybrachis mitis Fall, 1915
 Pachybrachis m-nigrum (F. E. Melsheimer, 1847)
 Pachybrachis mobilis Fall, 1915
 Pachybrachis morosus Simon, 1886
 Pachybrachis nero (Cuvier, 1832)
 Pachybrachis nigricornis (Say, 1824)
 Pachybrachis nigropunctatus Suffrian, 1854
 Pachybrachis nobilis Fall, 1915
 Pachybrachis nogalicus Fall, 1915
 Pachybrachis notatus Bowditch, 1910
 Pachybrachis nubigenus Fall, 1915
 Pachybrachis nubilis Bowditch, 1909
 Pachybrachis nunenmacheri Fall, 1915
 Pachybrachis obfuscatus Fall, 1915
 Pachybrachis obsoletus Suffrian, 1852
 Pachybrachis osceola Fall, 1915
 Pachybrachis osellai Daccordi & Ruffo, 1975
 Pachybrachis othonus (Say, 1825)
 Pachybrachis pagana Olivier, 1808
 Pachybrachis pallidulus Suffrian, 1851
 Pachybrachis parvinotatus Fall, 1915
 Pachybrachis pawnee Bloch & Schneider, 1801
 Pachybrachis peccans Suffrian, 1852
 Pachybrachis pectoralis (F. E. Melsheimer, 1847)
 Pachybrachis petitpierrei Daccordi, 1976
 Pachybrachis petronius Fall, 1915
 Pachybrachis picturatus (Ayres, 1855)
 Pachybrachis picus Weise, 1882
 Pachybrachis pinguescens Fall, 1915
 Pachybrachis pinicola Medvedev in Rouse and Medvedev, 1972
 Pachybrachis placidus Fall, 1915
 Pachybrachis planifrons Wagner, 1927
 Pachybrachis pluripunctatus Fall, 1915
 Pachybrachis postfasciatus Fall, 1915
 Pachybrachis posticus Suffrian, 1852
 Pachybrachis pradensis Marseul, 1875
 Pachybrachis praeclarus Weise, 1913
 Pachybrachis precarius Fall, 1915
 Pachybrachis prosopis Fall, 1915
 Pachybrachis proximus Bowditch, 1909
 Pachybrachis pteromelas Graells, 1858
 Pachybrachis pulvinatus Suffrian, 1852
 Pachybrachis punctatus Bowditch, 1909
 Pachybrachis puncticollis Bowditch, 1909
 Pachybrachis punicus Fall, 1915
 Pachybrachis purus Fall, 1915
 Pachybrachis pusillus Bowditch, 1909
 Pachybrachis quadratus Fall, 1915
 Pachybrachis quadricollis Suffrian, 1866
 Pachybrachis quadrioculatus Fall, 1915
 Pachybrachis regius Schaufuss, 1862
 Pachybrachis relictus Fall, 1915
 Pachybrachis rondanus Burlini, 1968
 Pachybrachis ruffoi Burlini, 1956
 Pachybrachis rugifer Abeille de Perrin, 1905
 Pachybrachis salfii Burlini, 1957
 Pachybrachis sallaei Jacoby, 1889
 Pachybrachis sanrita Bowditch, 1909
 Pachybrachis scripticollis Faldermann, 1837
 Pachybrachis scriptidorsum Marseul, 1875
 Pachybrachis scriptus Herrich-Schäffer, 1838
 Pachybrachis siculus Weise, 1891
 Pachybrachis signatifrons Mannerheim, 1843
 Pachybrachis signatus Bowditch, 1909
 Pachybrachis simius Marseul, 1875
 Pachybrachis sinuatus Mulsant & Rey, 1859
 Pachybrachis snowi Bowditch, 1909
 Pachybrachis sonorensis Jacoby, 1889
 Pachybrachis spumarius Suffrian, 1852
 Pachybrachis stygicus Fall, 1915
 Pachybrachis subfasciatus (J. E. LeConte, 1824)
 Pachybrachis sublimatus Fall, 1915
 Pachybrachis subvittatus J. L. LeConte, 1880
 Pachybrachis suffrianii Schaufuss, 1862
 Pachybrachis suturalis (Weise, 1882)
 Pachybrachis tacitus Moore, 1988
 Pachybrachis terminalis Suffrian, 1849
 Pachybrachis tessellatus (Olivier, 1791)
 Pachybrachis testaceus Perris, 1865
 Pachybrachis texanus Bowditch, 1909
 Pachybrachis thoracicus Linnaeus, 1758
 Pachybrachis tridens (F. E. Melsheimer, 1847)
 Pachybrachis trinotatus (F. E. Melsheimer, 1847)
 Pachybrachis trivittatus Bowditch, 1910
 Pachybrachis truncatus Bowditch, 1909
 Pachybrachis tumidus Bowditch, 1909
 Pachybrachis turbidus 
 Pachybrachis turgidicollis Fall, 1915
 Pachybrachis tybeensis Fall, 1915
 Pachybrachis umbraculatus Guenée, 1868
 Pachybrachis uncinatus Fall, 1915
 Pachybrachis uteanus Dejean
 Pachybrachis vacillatus Fall, 1915
 Pachybrachis varians Bowditch, 1909
 Pachybrachis varicolor Suffrian, 1852
 Pachybrachis vau Denis & Schiffermüller, 1775
 Pachybrachis vermicularis Suffrian, 1854
 Pachybrachis vestigialis Fall, 1915
 Pachybrachis viduatus (Zetterstedt, 1838)
 Pachybrachis viedmai Burlini, 1968
 Pachybrachis virgatus Kunth
 Pachybrachis vulnerosus Fall, 1915
 Pachybrachis wenzeli Fall, 1915
 Pachybrachis wickhami Bowditch, 1909
 Pachybrachis xantholucens Fall, 1915
 Pachybrachis xanti Gill, 1860

References

Pachybrachis